The 1952 Penn State Nittany Lions football team represented  Pennsylvania State University in the 1952 college football season. The team was coached by Rip Engle and played its home games in New Beaver Field in State College, Pennsylvania.

Schedule

References

Penn State
Penn State Nittany Lions football seasons
Penn State Nittany Lions football